This article shows the 2009 season of South Korean football.

National team results

Senior team

Under-23 team

K League

Regular season

Championship playoffs

Bracket

Final table

Korean FA Cup

Korean League Cup

Group stage

Group A

Group B

Knockout stage

Korea National League

Regular season

Championship playoffs

WK League

Regular season

Championship playoff

Pan-Pacific Championship

AFC Champions League

Group stage

Group E

Group F

Group G

Group H

Knockout stage

FIFA Club World Cup

See also
Football in South Korea

References

External links

 
2009